171 La Trobe Street is a building in Melbourne, Victoria, Australia, by architect Nonda Katsalidis.  171 La Trobe Street is a 13-storey structure glazed with a green glass exterior and designs overhanging the building on each side.

History 
The building was planned in the aftermath of the early 1990s recession in Australia, by the Cleeve Fowles Partnership which helped trigger a commercial building boom in the 90s. The building was designed by Nonda Katsalidis and his project team (Nick Orfanidis, Kerry Hayton, Ric Wood, Rob Wiggnall and Anthony Tosariero). 171 La Trobe Street was successfully completed in 1991 at A$12 million.

Physical aspects

171 La Trobe Street occupies four squares on the corner of Russell Street and La Trobe Street. The building rises uniformly with 10 storeys of office floors from a catenary canopy over a tavern at the ground level, with a pair of double-storey penthouses on the top. The residential usage of the building is differentiated from its office counterpart by accentuation of masses protruding from the apartments on the exterior.  Other distinctive features of 171 La Trobe Street include vertical shafts composed by green-glazed glass, horizontal curtain walling, vertical fins and black cladded shear wall. Stone paneling is used to form a steep contrast with the clear green glass that clads most of the main structure of the building. In the foyer, Austral black granite formally clads most of the walls, mainly for hidden storage installed behind and the exterior of the lift.

Functional aspects

Rendering an office floor area of 414 square meters, the location of the building at a street corner allows configuration of offices, board rooms, workstations and ancillary facilities to access panoramic view and natural light. A portion of the office space has been partitioned to a floor area of 225sqm with a mezzanine of 70sqm. Other features include handicap-friendly conveniences, three lifts and basement carparks.

Key influences and design approaches

Katsalidis wrote in his book titled "Three Residential Houses" that "The instinct of the eagle to the nest high explains the skywards urge that leads to the building these houses on top of a city building". Katsalidis believes that primitive arrangements of simple and few materials are capable of eliciting a stronger and more compiling response than over-sophisticated buildings with complex features. The construction of the penthouses at the top of 171 La Trobe Street is an illustration of his urge to harmonise the privacy of residential dwellings with the hustle and bustle of a vibrant metropolitan. Katsalidis described this concept of modern living in an elevated environment as "floating swiftly above the city in a rather remote and self-confident manner."

Katsalidis incorporates nature through the creation of roof top gardens and pools. The sensitivity to respect nature in its full form is essential to comfortable and habitable living. "The physical territory may have shrunk to this patch on top of a city building", but the spirit has its boundaries extend limitless to horizon beyond. "Views that extend to a distant horizon, with Mount Macedon in one direction and the blue expanse of the bay in the other", delineate the full extent of this human domain we live in.

The main body of the building is divided into two distinct vertical components, a feature common in Katsalidis’ designs;
one having rectangular windows with glazed green stone surface, and the other, a glazed green glass curtain wall.

Katsalidis’ ideas are represented through the experience of senses; i.e. based on how we interact with light, texture, density, volume and spatial qualities.

The building is substantially shaped by climatic considerations with the intention to expose the interiors towards the sky and nature. With the building situated to face the sun, translucent glass screens allow natural sunlight to perforate the whole building. High ceilings and long windows further allow natural light to easily penetrate thereby providing long hours of daylight and heat. In addition, the wind factor is regulated by filtering metal louver blades.

Awards

In 1992, Katsalidis-designed building won the RAIA Victorian Chapter Merit Award.

References

External links
 Nonda Katsalidis
 Fender Katsalidis Architects
 Articles of other project

Apartment buildings in Melbourne
Residential buildings completed in 1991
Buildings and structures in Melbourne City Centre
1991 establishments in Australia